Nikola Kuveljić (born 6 April 1997) is a Serbian professional footballer who plays as a midfielder for TSC Bačka Topola, on loan from Wisła Kraków.

Career

Club career
He was born in Zemun, a municipality of the city of Belgrade. He spent his youth career at the local club FK Zemun. His first senior club was FK IMT, playing in the Serbian League Belgrade (third national tier), for which he made his debut in the 2015/2016 season.

In 2018, he moved to Jedinstvo Surčin, a club playing in the same league. During the 2018/2019 season, he moved to Javor Ivanjica, who played in the Serbian First League. He helped the team with promotion to the Serbian SuperLiga for the 2019-20 season.

On 19 January 2020, he was loaned to Polish Ekstraklasa club Wisła Kraków for the rest of the season with an option to buy. On 28 May 2020, it was confirmed that the Polish club had triggered the option and Kuveljić signed a permanent deal until June 2023.

On 12 July 2022, he moved back to Serbia to join TSC Bačka Topola on a one-year loan spell.

References

External links

Living people
1997 births
Association football midfielders
Serbian footballers
Serbian expatriate footballers
FK Zemun players
FK Jedinstvo Surčin players
FK Javor Ivanjica players
Wisła Kraków players
FK TSC Bačka Topola players
Ekstraklasa players
Serbian SuperLiga players
Serbian First League players
Serbian expatriate sportspeople in Poland
Expatriate footballers in Poland